Aletta Stas-Bax (born 1965) is a Dutch entrepreneur and author. In 1988, together with her husband Peter Stas, she founded the watch company Frédérique Constant. The manufacture's initial strategy was to focus its energy on classical luxury watches at an affordable price. This strategy was the basis of strong growth during the 2007–2008 financial crisis when consumers were looking for lower prices.

Career 
Aletta Stas-Bax was named one of hundred most successful and influential female entrepreneurs in The Netherlands and 20 most influential women in Switzerland.
 
Aletta Stas-Bax is an advocate of gender diversity in board of directors.
 
In 2002, to diversify the Frédérique Constant group, Stas and her husband acquired Alpina Watches, a manufacturer of Swiss sports watches founded in 1883.
 
In 2013, in collaboration with Peter Stas, Gisbert L. Brunner and Alexander Linz, Aletta Stas-Bax wrote the book Live your passion, Building a watch manufacture.
 
Aletta Stas-Bax is currently member of the board of directors of Frédérique Constant.

References

Further reading
 
 

Living people
1965 births
People from Den Helder
Dutch businesspeople